The Provisional State Council (Moetzet HaMedina HaZmanit) was the temporary legislature of Israel from shortly before independence until the election of the first Knesset in January 1949. It took the place of His Majesty's Privy Council, through which the British Government had legislated for Mandatory Palestine.

History
The Provisional State Council was established under the name Moetzet HaAm (lit. People's Council) on 12 April 1948 in preparation for independence just over a month later. There were 37 members representing all sides of the Jewish political spectrum, from the Revisionists to the Communists. A separate body, Minhelet HaAm was set up as the proto-cabinet, all of whose members were also members of Moetzet HaAm.

On 14 May at 13:50, Moetzet HaAm met at the Jewish National Fund building in Tel Aviv to vote on the text of the Israeli Declaration of Independence. Despite disagreements over issues such as borders and religion, it was passed unanimously and the meeting ended at 15:00, an hour before the declaration was to be made. The 37 members were those that signed the declaration.

Following independence, the body was renamed the Provisional State Council. Its last meeting was held on 3 February 1949, after which it was replaced by the Constituent Assembly which was had been elected on 25 January. The Constituent Assembly first convened on 14 February, and two days later declared itself the first Knesset.

The council's titular figurehead, Chaim Weizmann, was Israel's de facto head of state until he was elected president in February 1949.

Members

External links
Historical overview of the Provisional State Council Knesset website
Provisional State Council Knesset website

Politics of Israel
Jewish organizations in Mandatory Palestine
Israeli Declaration of Independence
1948 in Israeli politics
1949 in Israeli politics